Pseudohemiodon thorectes is a species of armored catfish endemic to Bolivia where it is found in the Mamoré River basin.  This species grows to a length of  SL.

References
 

Loricariini
Fish of South America
Fish of Bolivia
Endemic fauna of Bolivia
Taxa named by Isaäc J. H. Isbrücker
Fish described in 1975